The Florida Commission on Offender Review, commonly referred to as FCOR or the Commission, was first known as the Pardon Board (created by the 1885 Florida Constitution) and then later, in 1941, the Florida Parole and Probation Commission. The Commission is a Governor and Cabinet agency.

Overview 
The Commission is a quasi-judicial, decision-making body that makes post-release decisions affecting inmates and ex-offenders. The different types of release authorized by FCOR are parole, conditional release, conditional medical release, and addiction recovery supervision.

Commissioners preside over approximately 36 meetings annually at the central office in Tallahassee and various locations throughout the state to encourage participation by victims, victims’ families, and inmates’ families who would otherwise not be able to attend. While offenders are not present at these hearings, the Commission provides a victim’s coordinator and an inmate family coordinator to assist both parties during the proceedings. Commissioners make a variety of determinations regarding parole and other types of release during the hearings. In addition, the Commission reviews releasees’ supervision status every two years, or as directed by the Commission.

All Commission hearings are open to the public and no case decisions are made outside of the public meeting. Panel cases are decided by two (2) Commissioners and the full Commission involves three (3) Commissioners, as assigned by the Chairman. Visiting Commissioners may be utilized, when assigned by the Chairman, in the absence of a current sitting Commissioner or Commissioner-appointee. The Chairman decides on “split” cases (those cases where the two (2) panel Commissioners do not agree) at any point in time that same day after he/she has had the opportunity to review the cases in order.

Per the Sunshine Law (§ 947.06, F.S.), public meetings such as those held by the Commission must be noticed at least seven (7) days in advance. This is done by the Commission’s Office of the Commission Clerk. Prior to each meeting, an agenda is prepared and is made available on the Commission’s website. Members of the public, including inmate supporters. Victims, and others opposed to an inmate, attend the hearings and are given an opportunity to address the Commissioners. Each side is given 10 minutes to present information. Inmate supporters go first followed by those opposed.

General Structure of the Meetings:

 Invocation
 Pledge of Allegiance
 Instructions by the Chairman
 Visitor Cases: Panel Cases Presented, Full Commission Cases Presented
 Non-Visitor Cases: Panel Cases, Full Commission Cases
 Revocation Cases
 Reviewing/Setting Conditions on Conditional Release & Addiction Recovery cases (Panel Cases)

The Commission is also the administrative arm of Executive Clemency. Clemency is the constitutionally authorized process that provides the means through which convicted felons may be considered for relief from punishment and seek restoration of their civil rights. The power to grant clemency is vested in the Governor with the agreement of two cabinet members who are also statewide elected officials. The Governor also has the sole power to deny clemency. There are seven types of clemency. They are full pardon, pardon without firearm authority, pardon for misdemeanor, commutation of sentence, remission of fines and forfeitures, specific authority to own, possess, or use firearms, and restoration of civil rights in Florida.

Leadership 
The Governor and Cabinet appoint members of the Commission from a list of eligible applicants submitted by a Parole Qualifications Committee. The five-member qualifications committee is appointed by the Governor and Cabinet and accepts and reviews applications. The Committee submits a list of three eligible applicants, which may include the incumbent if the Committee so decides, without the recommendation of its first choice. After the Governor and Cabinet have made their selection, the full Senate must then confirm the chosen applicant.

Departments 
The Commission is composed of the following departments: Division of Operations (Office of the Commission Clerk, Revocations, Victims’ Services, Field Services), Division of Administration, Office of General Counsel, Office of Legislative Affairs, Office of Communications, Office of Executive Clemency, and the Office of Clemency Investigations.

Locations 
The Commission has multiple offices throughout the state of Florida. The central office is in Tallahassee, with regional offices in Quincy, Jacksonville, Melbourne, Stuart, and Tampa

References 

"Commission Reports and Publications". The Florida Commission on Offender Review. Retrieved 2 May 2022.

Dunkelberger, Lloyd; December 4, Florida Phoenix; 2019. "More elderly and ill prisoners would be eligible for release under a proposed House bill". Florida Phoenix. Retrieved 2022-05-02.

"Florida Cabinet". MyFlorida.com. Retrieved 2 May 2022.

"Florida clemency board approves automatic restoration of felons' civil rights". Orlando Sentinel. Retrieved 2022-05-02.

"Florida Commission decides conditional medical release for sick inmates". Florida Bulldog. 2019-12-17. Retrieved 2022-05-02.

"Florida Commission on Offender Review Administrative Code". Florida Department of State. Retrieved 2 May 2022.

"Florida Commission on Offender Review". Office of Programs Policy Analysis and Government Accountability. Retrieved 2 May 2022.

Perry, Mitch; October 8, Florida Phoenix; 2019 (2019-10-08). "In federal hearing, judge appears skeptical of Florida's new felon-voting restoration system". Florida Phoenix. Retrieved 2022-05-02.

"Rules of Executive Clemency". The Florida Commission on Offender Review. Retrieved 2 May 2022.

"Three on Florida Commission decide parole for thousands of inmates". Florida Bulldog. 2019-12-13. Retrieved 2022-05-02.

Government of Florida
Parole in the United States